Carl Wright is the Bishop Suffragan for Armed Services and Federal Ministries in the Episcopal Church in the United States. He was elected by the house of bishops on September 20, 2016, on the second ballot. He was consecrated bishop on February 11, 2017.

He enlisted in the US Air Force in 1978. Later he was commissioned as an officer in the Maryland Army National Guard, and U.S. Army Reserve.  In 1993 he was commissioned as a chaplain in the US Air Force. He retired from the Air Force as a lieutenant colonel in 2011. He is an associate member of the Order of the Holy Cross.

References

Living people
Year of birth missing (living people)
Episcopal bishops for the Armed Forces (United States)
United States Air Force airmen
Maryland National Guard personnel
United States Air Force chaplains
United States Army chaplains